= Norton PC Checkup =

Norton PC Checkup was a program downloaded either separately or as a bundle with updates to Adobe Flash, provided to enable users to perform a system checkup of their Microsoft Windows based personal computers. It was launched by Symantec in October 2008.

The program has since been succeeded by Norton Live.

== Criticism ==
This software was initially criticized by users for its similarity to various malware "virus removers", but a software fix was published by Symantec to resolve this problem. This software was also installed on Toshiba Windows 7 laptops under the name of Toshiba Security Dashboard. The problem with this was, a user was unable to uninstall the software because there was no uninstaller in the program folder, and it wasn't even listed in Programs and Features. The solution was to uninstall the Toshiba Security Dashboard, thus uninstalling the Norton Product.
